The Voice of the Cult is the fourth studio album by heavy metal band Chastain, released in 1988 through Leviathan Records.

Critical reception

Andy Hinds at AllMusic gave The Voice of the Cult two stars out of five, calling it "mainly a rehash of the band's Ruler of the Wasteland album, which had better songs" while saying that it would appeal to fans of David Chastain's guitar work and Leather Leone's singing. Canadian journalist Martin Popoff notices the better production in comparison with Chastain's previous efforts, but concludes that the album is "as usual, useful as a guitar showcase, laughable as a band recording."

Track listing

Personnel

Band members
Leather Leone – lead vocals, background vocals
David T. Chastain – guitar, production
Mike Skimmerhorn – bass, background vocals
Ken Mary – drums

Production
Dale Smith – guitar, bass and vocals recording engineer
Terry Date – drums recording engineer, mixing
George Horn – mastering at Fantasy Studios, Berkeley, California

References

Chastain (band) albums
1988 albums